Fisherville is an unincorporated community in Jackson Township, Dauphin County, in the U.S. state of Pennsylvania.

History
Fisherville was laid out in 1858, and named for Maj. George Fisher. A post office was established at Fisherville in 1851, and remained in operation until it was discontinued in 1936.

References

Unincorporated communities in Dauphin County, Pennsylvania
Populated places established in 1858
Unincorporated communities in Pennsylvania